César Lizano is a Costa Rican long-distance runner. At the 2012 Summer Olympics, he competed in the Men's marathon, finishing in 65th place.

Personal bests
3000 m steeplechase: 8:52.3 min –  San José, 9 July 2001
Half marathon: 1:05:51 hrs –  Philadelphia, Pennsylvania, 15 September 2013 
Marathon: 2:17:50 hrs –  Chicago, Illinois, 9 October 2011

Achievements

References

External links

sports-reference
Tilastopaja biography

1982 births
Living people
Costa Rican male long-distance runners
Costa Rican male marathon runners
Costa Rican steeplechase runners
Sportspeople from San José, Costa Rica
Olympic athletes of Costa Rica
Athletes (track and field) at the 2012 Summer Olympics
Central American Games bronze medalists for Costa Rica
Central American Games medalists in athletics
20th-century Costa Rican people
21st-century Costa Rican people